Asha Katherine Randall (born 6 April 1990) is an English synchronised swimmer who represented Great Britain in the team event at the 2012 London Olympics.

Asha is the younger sister of synchronized swimmer Jenna Randall. Since announcing her retirement in 2013 from the sport along with her sister and other member of the London 2012 team, Asha has been performing as part Aquabatix, a synchronized swimming act which featured on Britain's Got Talent.

References

External links
 
 
 
 
 

1990 births
Living people
British synchronised swimmers
Olympic synchronised swimmers of Great Britain
Synchronized swimmers at the 2012 Summer Olympics
People from Ascot, Berkshire